Crescent Dragonwagon (née Ellen Zolotow, November 25, 1952, New York City) is a multigenre writer. She has written fifty books, including two novels, seven cookbooks and culinary memoirs, more than twenty children's books, a biography, and a collection of poetry. In addition, she has written for magazines including The New York Times Book Review, Lear's, Cosmopolitan, McCall's, and The Horn Book.

Biography

Dragonwagon and her late husband, Ned Shank, owned Dairy Hollow House, a country inn and restaurant in the Ozark Mountain community of Eureka Springs, Arkansas. Dragonwagon later co-founded the non-profit Writer's Colony at Dairy Hollow, and was active in the cultural and literary life of Arkansas throughout the 31 years she lived in the state full-time. After Shank's death in 2000, Dragonwagon moved to her family's summer home in Vermont. Dragonwagon has been a vegetarian since the age of 22. In 2002, she authored a vegetarian cookbook, Passionate Vegetarian.

Since the 2014 death of her subsequent partner, filmmaker-activist David R. Koff, with whom she lived in Vermont for a decade, she has divided her time among New York, Vermont, and Arkansas.

Dragonwagon is the daughter of the writers Charlotte and Maurice Zolotow. She serves as literary executor to both her parents.

Awards

Dragonwagon's tenth children's book, Half a Moon and One Whole Star, illustrated by Jerry Pinkney and published in 1986, was the winner of a Coretta Scott King Award, as well as a Reading Rainbow Selection. In 1991 she won Arkansas' Porter Prize.

In 2003, Dragonwagon's cookbook Passionate Vegetarian won the James Beard book award in the category "Vegetarian/Healthy Focus".

Books

Biography

Cookbooks

Dairy Hollow House Cookbook, 1992
, nominated for both the James Beard and IACP Awards
Passionate Vegetarian (2002), Winner, James Beard Award
The Cornbread Gospels (2007)
Bean by Bean: A Cookbook (2011)
 Putting Up Stuff for the Cold Time: Canning, Preserving & Pickling for Those New to the Art or Not (1973)

Children's books
 Rainy Day Together (Harper & Row, 1971), as by Ellen Parsons, children's picture book illustrated by Lillian Hoban
When Light Turns into Night (1975) 
Wind Rose (1976)  (with Ronald Himler)
Will It Be Okay? (1977) 
 Your Owl Friend (1977) , picture book illus. Ruth Lercher Bornstein 
 If You Call My Name (1981) , picture book illus. David Palladini 
 "Katie in the Morning" (1983) , picture book illus. Betsy A. Day
I Hate My Brother Harry (1983)
Always, Always (1984) 
Coconut (1984) , picture book illus. Nancy Tafuri
Alligator Arrived With Apples: A Potluck Alphabet Feast (1985) 
Half a Moon and One Whole Star (1986) , picture book illus. Jerry Pinkney
This Is the Bread I Baked for Ned (1989) 
Home Place (1990) , picture book illus. Jerry Pinkney
Winter Holding Spring (1990) 
Alligators and Others All Year Long (1993)
Annie Flies the Birthday Bike (1993)
Brass Button (1997)
Bat in the Dining Room (1997)
And Then It Rained / And Then the Sun Came Out (2002)
Sack of Potatoes (2002)
All the Awake Animals Are Almost Asleep (2012)

Novels
The Year It Rained (1985) 
To Take A Dare (1982) (co-authored with the late Paul Zindel)

See also

References

External links
 
 Crescent Dragonwagon at Library of Congress Authorities — with 40 catalog records

1952 births
20th-century American non-fiction writers
20th-century American novelists
20th-century American women writers
American children's writers
American cookbook writers
American food writers
Jewish American writers
American women children's writers
American women non-fiction writers
American women novelists
James Beard Foundation Award winners
Living people
Novelists from Vermont
People from Carroll County, Arkansas
People from Eureka Springs, Arkansas
Women cookbook writers
Women food writers
21st-century American Jews
21st-century American women
Vegetarian cookbook writers